Odin is a utility software program developed and used by Samsung internally which is used to communicate with Samsung devices in Odin mode (also called download mode). It can be used to flash a custom recovery firmware image (as opposed to the stock recovery firmware image) to a Samsung Android device. Odin is also used for unbricking certain Android devices. Odin is the Samsung proprietary alternative to Fastboot. 

There is no account of Samsung ever having officially openly released Odin, though it is mentioned in the developer documents for Samsung Knox SDK and some documents even instruct users to use Odin. Some other docs on Knox SDK reference "engineering firmware", which presumably can be a part of the Knox SDK along with Odin. Publicly available binaries are believed to be the result of leaks. The tool is not intended for consumers, but for Samsung's own personnel and approved repair centers.

Usage 

Although none of the publicly available downloads are authorized by Samsung itself, XDA-Developers consider the files offered on their Forum (Patched Odin 3.13.1) the safest option.

For the usage of Odin, the phone needs to be in Odin mode. For this, some key combination need to be pressed, such as Power + Volume Down + Home.

Alternatives 

Heimdall is a free/libre/open-source, cross-platform replacement for Odin which is based on libusb. The name Heimdall, like Odin, is an allusion to Norse mythology; both Odin and Heimdall are among the deities of the Norse pantheon.

References 

Android (operating system) software
Proprietary software
Samsung software
Windows software